Sahelanthropus tchadensis is an extinct species of the Homininae (African apes) dated to about , during the Miocene epoch. The species, and its genus Sahelanthropus, was announced in 2002, based mainly on a partial cranium, nicknamed Toumaï, discovered in northern Chad.

Sahelanthropus tchadensis lived close to the time of the chimpanzee–human divergence, possibly related to Orrorin, a species of Homininae that lived about one million years later. It may have been ancestral to both humans and chimpanzees (which would place it in the tribe Hominini), or alternatively an early member of the tribe Gorillini. In 2020, the femur was analyzed, and it was found that Sahelanthropus was not bipedal, casting some doubt on its position as a human ancestor, but this was refuted in 2022.

Taxonomy

Discovery

By the time Michel Brunet and colleagues formally described the remains in 2002, a total of six specimens had been recovered: a nearly complete but heavily deformed skull, a fragment of the midline of the jaw with the tooth sockets for an incisor and canine, a right third molar, a right first incisor, a right jawbone with the last premolar to last molar, and a right canine. With the skull as the holotype specimen, they were grouped into a new genus and species as Sahelanthropus tchadensis, the genus name referring to the Sahel, and the species name to Chad. These, along with Australopithecus bahrelghazali, were the first discoveries of any fossil African great ape (outside the genus Homo) made beyond eastern and southern Africa. By 2005, a third premolar was recovered from the TM 266 locality, a lower jaw missing the region behind the second molar from the TM 292 locality, and a lower left jaw preserving the sockets for premolars and molars from the TM 247 locality.

The skull was nicknamed "Toumaï", a name from the local Daza language meaning "hope of life", given to infants born just before the dry season. The nickname was suggested by the then-president of Chad, Idriss Déby, in honour of one of his comrades-in-arms who had been killed in the coup d'état against his predecessor, Hissène Habré. Toumaï also became a source of national pride, and Brunet announced the discovery before the Ministry of Foreign Affairs and a television audience in the capital of N'Djamena, "l'ancêtre de l'humanité est Tchadien...Le berceau de l'humanité se trouve au Tchad. Toumaï est votre ancêtre" ("The ancestor of humanity is Chadian...The cradle of humanity is in Chad. Toumaï is your ancestor.")

Toumaï had been found with a femur, but this was stored with animal bones and shipped to the University of Poitiers in 2003, where it was stumbled upon by graduate student Aude Bergeret the next year. She took the bone to the head of the Department of Geosciences, Roberto Macchiarelli, who considered it to be inconsistent with bipedalism contra what Brunet et al. had earlier stated in their description analysing only the distorted skull. This was conspicuous because Brunet and his team had already explicitly stated Toumaï was associated with no limb bones, which could have proven or disproven their conclusions of locomotion. Because Brunet had declined to comment on the subject, Macchiarelli and Bergeret petitioned to present their preliminary findings during an annual conference organised by the Anthropological Society of Paris, which would be held at Poitiers that year. This was rejected as they had not formally published their findings yet. They were able to publish a full description in 2020, and concluded Sahelanthropus was not bipedal.

In 2022, French primatologist Franck Guy and colleagues reported that a hominin left femur (TM 266-01-063), and a right (TM 266-01-358) and a left (TM 266-01-050) ulna (forearm bone) were also discovered at the site in 2001, but were excluded originally from Sahelanthropus because they could not be reliably associated with the skull. They decided to include it because Sahelanthropus is the only hominin known from the site, and they concluded that the material is consistent with obligate bipedalism, the earliest evidence of such.

All Sahelanthropus specimens, representing six to nine different adults, have been recovered within the  area.

Taphonomy
Upon description, Brunet and colleagues were able to constrain the TM 266 locality to 7 or 6 million years ago (near the end of the Late Miocene) based on the animal assemblage, which made Sahelanthropus the earliest African ape at the time. In 2008, Anne-Elisabeth Lebatard and colleagues (which includes Brunet) attempted to radiometrically date using the 10Be/9Be ratio the sediments Toumaï was found near (dubbed the "anthracotheriid unit" after the commonplace Libycosaurus petrochii). Averaging the ages of 28 samples, they reported an approximate date of 7.2–6.8 million years ago.

Their methods were soon challenged by Beauvilain, who clarified that Toumaï was found on loose sediments at the surface rather than being "unearthed", and had probably been exposed to the harsh sun and wind for some time considering it was encrusted in an iron shell and desert varnish. This would mean it is unsafe to assume that the skull and nearby sediments were deposited at the same time, making such radiometric dating impossible. Further, the Sahelanthropus fossils lack white silaceous cement which is present on every other fossil in the site, which would mean they date to different time periods. Because the large mammal fossils were scattered across the area instead of concentrated like the Sahelanthropus fossils, the discoverers originally believed the Sahelanthropus fossils were dumped there by a palaeontologist or geologist, but later dismissed this because the skull was too complete to have been thrown away like that. In 2009, Beauvilain and  argued that Toumaï was purposefully buried in a "grave", because the skull was also found with two parallel rows of large mammal fossils, seemingly forming a  box. Because the "grave" is orientated in a northeast–southwest direction towards Mecca, and all sides of the skull were exposed to the wind and were eroded (meaning the skull had somehow turned), they argued that Toumaï was first buried by nomads who identified the skull as human and collected nearby limb fossils (believing them to belong with the skull) and buried them, and was reburied again sometime after the 11th century by Muslims who reorientated the grave towards Mecca when the fossils were re-exposed.

Classification

When describing the species in 2002, Brunet et al. noted the combination of features which would be considered archaic or derived for a species on the human line (the subtribe Hominina), the latter namely bipedal locomotion and reduced canine teeth, which they interpreted as evidence of its position near the chimpanzee–human last common ancestor (CHLCA). This classification made Sahelanthropus the oldest Hominina, shifting the centre of origin for the clade away from East Africa. They also suggested that Sahelanthropus could be a sister group to the 5.5 to 4.5 million year old Ardipithecus and later Hominina. The classification of Sahelanthropus in Hominina, as well as Ardipithecus and the 6 million year old Orrorin, was at odds with molecular analyses of the time which had placed the CHLCA between 6 and 4 million years ago based on a high mutation rate of about 70 mutations per generation. All these genera were anatomically too derived to represent a basal hominin (the group containing chimps and humans), so molecular data would only permit their classification into more ancient and now-extinct lineages. This was overturned in 2012 by geneticists Aylwyn Scally and Richard Durbin who studied the genomes of children and their parents and found the mutation was actually half that, placing the CHLCA anywhere from 14 to 7 million years ago, though most geneticists and palaeoanthropologists use 8 to 7 million years ago. 

A further possibility is that Toumaï is not ancestral to either humans or chimpanzees at all, but rather an early representative of the Gorillini lineage. Brigitte Senut and Martin Pickford, the discoverers of Orrorin tugenensis, suggested that the features of S. tchadensis are consistent with a female proto-gorilla. Even if this claim is upheld the find would lose none of its significance, because at present, very few chimpanzee or gorilla ancestors have been found anywhere in Africa. Thus if S. tchadensis is an ancestral relative of the chimpanzees or gorillas, then it represents the earliest known member of their lineage. And S. tchadensis does indicate that the last common ancestor of humans and chimpanzees is unlikely to closely resemble extant chimpanzees, as had been previously supposed by some paleontologists.

With the sexual dimorphism known to have existed in early hominins, the difference between Ardipithecus and Sahelanthropus may not be large enough to warrant a separate species for the latter.

Anatomy

Existing fossils include a relatively small cranium, five pieces of jaw, and some teeth, making up a head that has a mixture of derived and primitive features. A virtual reconstruction of the interior of the braincase indicated a cranial capacity of 378 cm3, similar to that of extant chimpanzees and approximately a third the size of modern human brains.

The teeth, brow ridges, and facial structure differ markedly from those found in modern humans. Cranial features show a flatter face, U-shaped tooth rows, small canines, an anterior foramen magnum, and heavy brow ridges. The only known skull suffered a large amount of distortion during the time of fossilisation and discovery, as the cranium is dorsoventrally flattened, and the right side is depressed.

In the original description in 2002, Brunet et al. said it "would not be unreasonable" to speculate that Sahelanthropus was capable of maintaining an upright posture while walking bipedally. Because they had not reported any limb bones or other post-cranial material (anything other than the skull), this was based on the reconstructed original orientation of the foramen magnum (where the skull connects the spine), and their classification of Sahelanthropus into Hominina based on facial comparisons (one of the diagnostic characteristics of Hominina is bipedalism). This was soon disputed because the orientation of the foramen magnum is not an entirely conclusive piece of evidence in regard to the question of habitual posture, and the features used to classify Sahelanthropus into Hominina are not entirely unique to Hominina. In 2020, the femur had been formally described, and the study concluded it was not consistent with habitual bipedalism. However, recent postcranial evidence suggests characteristics consistent with habitual bipedalism and arboreal clambering. Ulnar morphologies including bone curvature, cross-section, and orientation combine to rule out quadrupedalism, and femoral morphologies allowing for higher compressive loads of bipedalism strongly suggest hominin characteristics in Sahelanthropus tchadensis.

See also

 Ardipithecus
 Chimpanzee–human last common ancestor
 Human evolution
 List of human evolution fossils (with images)
 Orrorin

References

Further reading

External links

 Fossil Hominids: Toumai
 National Geographic: Skull Fossil Opens Window Into Early Period of Human Origins
 New Findings Bolster Case for Ancient Human Ancestor 
 Sahelanthropus tchadensis, Toumaï, Detailed composition of the Franco-Chadian palaeoanthropological Mission, the sahara scientific missions, the discovery's context, controversy about the misplacement of a molar, the minimum number of individuals, the geology of the site, was Toumaï buried ? and research to date the skull,...
 Sahelanthropus news reporting by John Hawks
 S. tchadensis reconstruction
 Sahelanthropus tchadensis Origins – Exploring the Fossil Record – Bradshaw Foundation
 Human Timeline (Interactive) – Smithsonian, National Museum of Natural History (August 2016).

Hominini
Homininae
Miocene primates of Africa
Fossil taxa described in 2002
Prehistoric Chad